Hexeretmis is a genus of moths in the family Alucitidae.

Species
Hexeretmis argo Meyrick, 1929
Hexeretmis pontopora 
Hexeretmis willineri

References 

Alucitidae
Ditrysia genera